"Reach Out Your Hand (And Touch Somebody)" is a song recorded by American country music artist Tammy Wynette. It was released in April 1972 as the second single from her album Bedtime Story. The song peaked at number 2 on the Billboard Hot Country Singles chart. It also reached number 1 on the RPM Country Tracks chart in Canada. The song was written by Wynette, along with Billy Sherrill.

Charts

Weekly charts

Year-end charts

References

1972 singles
Tammy Wynette songs
Songs written by Billy Sherrill
Song recordings produced by Billy Sherrill
Epic Records singles
Songs written by Tammy Wynette
1972 songs